Biała County is a county in Lublin Voivodeship, eastern Poland, on the border with Belarus. It was established on January 1, 1999, as a result of the Polish local government reforms passed in 1998. Its administrative seat is the city of Biała Podlaska, although the city is not part of the county (it constitutes a separate city county).

As of 2019, its total population is 111,078, including 16,736 in Międzyrzec Podlaski, 5,537 in Terespol, and a rural population of 88,805.

Neighbouring counties
Apart from the city of Biała Podlaska, Biała Podlaska County is bordered by Włodawa County and Parczew County to the south, Radzyń Podlaski County to the south-west, Łuków County and Siedlce County to the west, Łosice County to the north-west, and Siemiatycze County to the north. It also borders Belarus to the east.

Administrative division
The county is subdivided into 19 municipalities (two urban and 17 rural). These are listed in the following table, in descending order of population.

References

 
Land counties of Lublin Voivodeship